Pulang is a 2018 Malaysian Malay-language drama film directed by Kabir Bhatia and written by Mira Mustaffa and Ahmad Izham Omar.

Cast 
 Remy Ishak as Othman
 Puteri Aishah as Thom
 Alvin Wong as Lum
 Azrel Ismail as Omar
 Erwin Dawson as Ahmad
 Juliana Evans as Alia
 Jalaluddin Hassan as Omar (50s)
 Rahim Razali as Jamil (90s)
 Sherry Al Jeffry as Thom (70s)
 Aida Khalida as Jaybah
 Idan Aedan as Omar 11 years (as Shahidan Abdullah)
 Akmal Ahmad as Karim
 Nur Akhtar Mohamad Amin as Salmah
 Iman Haidar as Omar 6 years
 Syazuwan Hassan as Cikgu Hassan

References

External links 
 
 

2018 films
Malaysian drama films
2018 drama films